The Australian Trade Practices Commission was the agency responsible for monitoring and enforcement activities under the Trade Practices Act 1974. It was replaced by the Australian Competition and Consumer Commission in 1995.

References

Defunct Commonwealth Government agencies of Australia
Economic history of Australia
1974 establishments in Australia
1995 disestablishments in Australia